The Nowruz oil field, in the Persian Gulf, Iran, was the site of several 1983 oil spills.

1983 oil spills 
One spill was initially caused by a tanker hitting a platform. In March, 1983, the platform was attacked by Iraqi helicopters and the spill caught fire. The Iran–Iraq War prevented technicians from capping the well until 18 September 1983. It was capped with cement. Eleven people were killed during the capping.

A separate spill occurred when Iraqi helicopters attacked a nearby platform in March 1983. The rig well was capped in May 1985. Nine men were killed during the capping. Approximately 733,000 barrels (100,000 tonnes) of oil were spilled because of this incident.

Overall, 80 million gallons (about 260,000 tons) of oil were spilled.

References 

Oil fields of Iran
Oil spills in Asia
1983 in Iran
1983 disasters in Iran